Abernathy Field Station is a  outdoor ecology classroom serving Washington & Jefferson College (W&J College).

These ecosystems support a diverse slate of wildlife, including birds, salamanders, fish, small mammals, white-tailed deer, various insects, and over 100 trees. The facility is equipped with a NexSens-brand real-time weather station and stream monitoring system to provide background data for research.

The Abernathy Field Station is operated by W&J College, allowing faculty and students to study the structure and function of the ecosystems and wildlife in it through coursework and independent research projects. Students may not conduct research at the facility without faculty supervision. Access to the land has been provided to the college by Dr. Ernest and Janet Abernathy, and the college has committed itself to preserving the ecological integrity of the land while utilizing it as an outdoor classroom.

In 2008, W&J College received a $1 million grant from the Howard Hughes Medical Institute which would provide funding for long-term ecological monitoring at the Field Station.

Gallery

References

External links

Abernathy Field Station official website

Washington & Jefferson College
Nature centers in Pennsylvania
Forest research institutes
University and college laboratories in the United States
Protected areas of Washington County, Pennsylvania
Ecological experiments